Sibon nebulatus, commonly known as the clouded snake, is a species of small, slender arboreal snake which is found in southern Mexico, Central America, northern South America, Isla Margarita, and Trinidad and Tobago.

Description
The body colour of S. nebulatus varies from grey to brown with dark brown irregular ring-like crossbands. These crossbands are edged by fine, irregular, beige spots. The belly ranges from white to beige, speckled with tiny dark brown points. The labial scale on the upper lip behind the eye is enlarged. In cloud forests of northwestern Ecuador, S. nebulatus is often confused with another snake, the Elegant Snail-Eater (Dipsas elegans), which can be distinguished by its pairs of narrow vertical bars between which there is a more pale bar, as opposed to the unpaired vertical bars of S. nebulatus.

References

Further reading

Colubrids
Reptiles of Belize
Reptiles of Brazil
Reptiles of Colombia
Reptiles of Costa Rica
Reptiles of Ecuador
Reptiles of El Salvador
Reptiles of French Guiana
Reptiles of Guatemala
Reptiles of Guyana
Reptiles of Honduras
Reptiles of Mexico
Reptiles of Nicaragua
Reptiles of Panama
Reptiles of Trinidad and Tobago
Reptiles of Venezuela
Reptiles described in 1758
Taxa named by Carl Linnaeus